Castle Provincial Park is a provincial park in southern Alberta, Canada. It is located within the Municipal District of Pincher Creek No. 9 west of the Town of Pincher Creek, sharing a northern boundary with the Municipality of Crowsnest Pass, a southwestern boundary with British Columbia, a southeastern boundary with Waterton Lakes National Park and a northeastern boundary with Castle Provincial Park.

The designation of Castle Wildland Provincial Park was approved on January 20, 2017, with an effective date of February 16, 2017.

References 

2017 establishments in Alberta
Municipal District of Pincher Creek No. 9
Provincial parks of Alberta
Protected areas established in 2017